Allan Hubbard or Allen Hubbard may refer to:

Allan Hubbard (businessman) (1928–2011), New Zealand businessman
Allan B. Hubbard (born 1947), American business executive and former Assistant to President George W. Bush and Director of the National Economic Council
Allan Hubbard (actor) (born 1972), former American child actor

See also
Al Hubbard (disambiguation)
Hubbard (surname)